Anne O'Brien may refer to:

 Anne O'Brien, 2nd Countess of Orkney (died 1756), Scottish noblewoman
 Anne O'Brien (athlete) (1911–2007), American track and field athlete
 Anne O'Brien (footballer), Irish footballer
 Anne Philomena O'Brien, Australian historian

See also
 Anne Rice (Howard Allen Frances O'Brien, 1941–2021), American author